Patrick Hughes (born May 13, 1978) is an Australian film director and screenwriter.

Early life
Hughes was born in Black Rock, a suburb of Melbourne. He started making short films when he was young. Hughes attended film school at the Victorian College of the Arts, graduating in 1999.

Career
After making a string of high-profile commercials and shorts, and multiple failed attempts to option a script for an action/western film, he decided to direct it himself under a short schedule and low budget, in what would eventually become the 2010 film Red Hill starring Ryan Kwanten, Steve Bisley and Tom E. Lewis.

Hughes' various commercials and previous 2008 short film Signs caught the attention of Hollywood star Sylvester Stallone, who was looking for 'new blood' to direct the third installment of the lucrative The Expendables franchise. Hughes filmed The Expendables 3 from August to October 2013 and the film held its world premiere in London on 4 August 2014.

Hughes was announced as the director of the remake of the 2011 Indonesian action film The Raid: Redemption with Taylor Kitsch to star, but by October 2015 once both Kitsch and Screen Gems had dropped out of the project Hughes also dropped out as director.

Hughes next directed the 2017 action comedy film The Hitman's Bodyguard, starring Ryan Reynolds, Samuel L. Jackson, Gary Oldman, and Salma Hayek, which earned $180.6 million worldwide against a production budget between $30–69 million. A sequel, Hitman’s Wife’s Bodyguard, also directed by Hughes with Reynolds, Jackson, and Hayek returning in addition to Antonio Banderas and Morgan Freeman, was released on June 16, 2021, after being delayed previously to August 20, 2021 from an original release date of August 28, 2020 because of the COVID-19 pandemic.

In 2021, Hughes established his own film production company, Huge Films, in partnership with Greg McLean and James Beaufort.

Filmography
Short films
 The Director (2000)
 The Lighter (2001)
 Signs (2008)

Feature films
 Red Hill (2010)
 The Expendables 3 (2014)
 The Hitman's Bodyguard (2017) 
 Hitman's Wife's Bodyguard (2021) 
 The Man from Toronto (2022)

References

External links

1978 births
Living people
21st-century Australian male writers
21st-century Australian screenwriters
Action film directors
Australian film directors
Australian male screenwriters
Film directors from Melbourne
Writers from Melbourne
People from Black Rock, Victoria
Victorian College of the Arts alumni